Earth vs. The Radiators: the First 25 is the thirteenth album released by The Radiators in their twenty-five-year-long career, and their fifth live album.  Recorded at a series of twenty-fifth anniversary concerts held at Tipitina's club in New Orleans—the same site where their first album, Work Done on Premises was recorded—this two CD set features numerous guest appearances by southern US musicians.

The album was released simultaneously with a concert DVD.  Despite bearing the same name, the album and DVD feature almost no songs in common.

Track listing

Disc 1:

 "City of Refuge" (traditional) — 10:53
 "Crazy Mona" (Ed Volker) — 11:06
 "Midnight Rider" (Gregg Allman) — 3:32
 "Junco Partner" (Shad?) — 7:12
 "Wating for the Rain" (Volker) — 10:11
 "I Don't Speak Love" (Dave Malone) — 7:12
 "Make Fire" (Volker) — 9:24
 "Go Back the Way You Came" (Volker, Malone) — 7:15
 "River Run" (Volker) — 11:51

Disc 2:

 "Meet Me Down in Birdland" (Volker) — 5:00
 "Sitting on Top of the World" (Howlin' Wolf) — 10:13
 "Danang" (Volker) — 6:02
 "I Like My Poison" (Volker, Malone) — 8:04
 "Hard Rock Kid" (Volker) — 7:25
 "Fools Go First" (Volker) — 6:59
 "Soul on Fire" (Volker) — 7:51
 "Wild and Free" (Volker, Malone) — 6:21
 "Lila" (Volker) — 8:58
 "Lovely You" (Volker) — 10:15

Credits
 Ed Volker – vocals, keyboards
 Dave Malone – vocals, guitars
 Camile Baudoin – guitar
 Reggie Scanlan – bass
 Frank Bua Jr. – drums
 George Porter Jr. – (guest) bass
 Theresa Andersson – (guest) vocals
 Mark Mullins – (guest) trombone
 Karl Denson – (guest) saxophone
 Mike Skinkus – (guest) percussion

External links
 PopMatters review

The Radiators (American band) albums
2004 live albums